Mahayanam is a 1989 Indian Malayalam-language film directed by Joshy and produced by C T Rajan, starring Mammootty, Seema, Jalaja and Mukesh.

Plot
Chandran is a truck driver and Ravi is the cleaner of the truck. Chandran is very affectionate towards Ravi, for whom, Chandran is like an elder brother. Chandran spends most of his leisure time in booze, while Ravi is busy in saving all the money, as he has got a family. One day, Ravi gets a letter from Remani, his wife saying that there is festival in the village temple set to happen for the coming Friday and she requested him to be there. Excited Ravi sets out to his home with all the  cash he has saved as he has plans to build a house and to be there for at least two weeks. But on his way back home, he was killed in an accident. Chandran arrives at the village of Ravi, with his dead body. He finds out the miserable condition of his family and decides to stay  for a few days to financially assist Remani and help her fulfill Ravi's dream house. But during his stay, he gets involved in several social issues. He slowly joins the job of ferrying sand under Kochu Varkey, a rich businessman of the area. But, with time, he enrages Kochu Varkey and his son Sunnykkutty, invites animosity from them. Rajamma, a bold and independent lady who makes a living by running a tea stall falls in love with Chandran, but certain unexpected incidents happen in the life of Chandran that turns everything upside down.

Cast
 Mammootty - Chandran
 Seema - Rajamma ( Voice dubbed by Anandavally )
  Mukesh - Ravi (cameo)
 Balan K. Nair
 Vineeth - Ramesan 
 Kunjandi - Matthu
 Mala Aravindan - Govindankutty
 Kuthiravattom Pappu -Barber  Kunjappan
 Prathapachandran - Kochu Varkey
 Vijayaraghavan as Sunnykutty,Kochu Varkey's son
 Jalaja - Ramani,Ravi's wife 
 Philomina - Janamma,Ravi's mother 
 Saleema - Mollykutty
 Soorya as Karthu

Soundtrack
"Urakkam Kankalil" (male) - M. G. Sreekumar
"Urakkam Kankalil" (female) - K. S. Chithra

Release
The film was released on 1986.

Box office
The film was both commercial and critical success.

Trivia
 Mammootty won the 1989  Kerala State Film Award for Best Actor.
 After Mahayanam,  Seema took a long break from acting. Later she made a comeback through Olympiyan Anthony Adam in 1999.
 The film was remade in Tamil as Paarai with R. Sarathkumar.

References

External links 
 

1989 films
1980s Malayalam-language films
Malayalam films remade in other languages
Films shot in Palakkad
Films scored by Ouseppachan
Films with screenplays by A. K. Lohithadas
Films directed by Joshiy